The Mond River, also known in English as the Mand River, runs through Fars Province and Bushehr Province in south-western Iran, flowing to the Persian Gulf.

See also
 Mond protected area

References

External links

Rivers of Fars Province
Landforms of Bushehr Province
Landforms of Fars Province